George Stringer (fl. 1554) was an English politician.

He was a Member (MP) of the Parliament of England for Derby in April 1554.

References

Year of birth missing
Year of death missing
English MPs 1554